Brickellia californica, known by the common name California brickellbush, is a species of flowering plant in the family Asteraceae.

Distribution
The plant is native to Northern Mexico in Baja California, Sonora, Chihuahua, and Coahuila states; and much of the Western United States, across California north to Oregon, northeast to Idaho and Wyoming, and east through the Southwestern states to Colorado, New Mexico, and West Texas.

It is found below , in many habitat types including forests, woodlands, scrub, grasslands, and deserts.

It is a common plant in many types of California habitats, including chaparral, coastal sage scrub, oak woodland, valley grassland, yellow pine forest, Sierra Nevada subalpine zone, and Mojave Desert sky islands.

Description
Brickellia californica is a thickly branching shrub growing  in height. The fuzzy, glandular leaves are roughly triangular in shape with toothed to serrated edges. The leaves are 1 - 6 centimeters long.

The inflorescences at the end of stem branches contain many small leaves and bunches of narrow, cylindrical flower heads. Each head is about 13 millimeters long and wrapped in flat, wide, purplish green overlapping phyllaries. At the tip of the head are a number of long white to pink disc florets.  The bloom period is August through November.

The fruit is a hairy cylindrical achene 3 millimeters long with a pappus of bristles.

Medicinal plant
The Navajo and Kumeyaay (Diegueño) peoples used it as a traditional medicinal plant for fevers, coughs, and prenatal complications.

References

External links
 Calflora Database:  Brickellia californica (California brickellbush)
Jepson Manual eFlora (TJM2) treatment of Brickellia californica
USDA Plants Profile for Brickellia californica (California brickellbush)
UC CalPhotos gallery of Brickellia californica

californica
Flora of California
Flora of the Northwestern United States
Flora of the Southwestern United States
Flora of the South-Central United States
Flora of Northeastern Mexico
Flora of Northwestern Mexico
Flora of the California desert regions
Flora of the Chihuahuan Desert
Flora of the Rocky Mountains
Flora of the Sierra Nevada (United States)
Flora of the Sonoran Deserts
Natural history of the California chaparral and woodlands
Natural history of the Mojave Desert
Natural history of the Peninsular Ranges
Natural history of the Santa Monica Mountains
Natural history of the Transverse Ranges
North American desert flora
Plants used in traditional Native American medicine
Plants described in 1841
Taxa named by Asa Gray
Taxa named by John Torrey
Flora without expected TNC conservation status